The cast of characters in miHoYo's Genshin Impact hails from the continent of Teyvat, comprising seven nations: Mondstadt, Liyue, Inazuma, Sumeru, Fontaine, Natlan and Snezhnaya. Each nation is ruled by one of the seven Archons, each of whom controls one of the seven elements (corresponding to the nation list above): Anemo, Geo, Electro, Dendro, Hydro, Pyro, and Cryo. Nearly all playable characters control one of the elements with the help of a Vision, a device granted by the heavens to those with great ambitions, with the exception of a few characters who control the elements through their own supernatural powers, such as the Archons and the Traveler.

Design 

Many of Genshin Impact'''s characters were first introduced in an official manga which was released prior to the game's launch.

When designing the characters, the designers must first decide who the character is at its core and their needs, then they may design the character to fit that original idea and those needs. Designers may also consider the relation of a character to other characters in Teyvat; for example the elegant and reserved opera singer Yun Jin was designed to juxtaposition the fiery and unbound rock star Xinyan.

Many characters are derived from legends of certain nations- the adepti of Liyue, for example, are based on the Xian of Daoism. The idea of the Vision itself also derives from Daoism- the concept of a third eye manifests itself in humans as the form of the Vision they receive.

 Characters 
 Playable 
The following is a table that lists all currently confirmed playable characters by region, and in alphabetical order. All playable characters are associated with a specific region, with the exception of the Travelers and Aloy, who come from their own world.

All characters may use one of 5 weapon types: swords, polearms, claymores, bows, or catalysts.

Outlanders

Mondstadt
Mondstadt was released in September 2020.

Liyue
Liyue was released in September 2020.

Inazuma
Inazuma was released in July 2021.

Sumeru
Sumeru was released in August 2022, and introduced the Dendro element to the game.

Snezhnaya
Snezhnaya is not yet a released region. One character from Snezhnaya is playable.

 Non-playable characters 
Non-playable characters include:
 Unknown God (Voice actor:  Rie Kugimiya,  Christie Cate,  Dian Tao,  Unknown), the God at the beginning of the game who fights the Traveler and abducts their sibling, thus beginning the Traveler's journey through Teyvat to find their sibling.
 Katheryne (Voice actor:  Mai Sato,  Erica Mendez,  Xiao N (Jiang Li),  Park Go-woon), receptionist of the Adventurer's Guild. It is revealed in the Sumeru chapter that Katheryne is a bionic puppet made in Snezhnaya.
 Paimon (Voice actor:  Aoi Koga,  Corina Boettger,  Duoduo Poi (Shi Xinlei),  Kim Ga-ryeong) is the Traveler's guide and accomplice. As the Traveler is a silent protagonist, Paimon speaks for the Traveler for most of the game.
 Several Fatui Harbingers: 
La Signora (Voice actor:  Yui Shoji,  Unknown,  Ziyin (Qi Tianyi),  Unknown) #8 of the Fatui Harbingers, the organization serving the Tsaritsa of the nation Snezhnaya. She steals Venti's Gnosis and bargains with Zhongli for his Gnosis, as the Tsaritsa desires to collect all Archons' Gnoses. After she helps to incite turmoil and a civil war in the nation of Inazuma, the Traveler challenges her to a duel, which leads to her execution by the Raiden Shogun.
 Il Dottore, (Voice actor:  Toshihiko Seki,  Mick Wingert,  Wu Lei,  Park Seong-tae) #2 of the Fatui Harbingers. He is a mad scientist and the main antagonist of the Sumeru chapter.
 Dainsleif (Voice actor:  Kenjiro Tsuda,  Yuri Lowenthal,  Ye Sun,  Choi Han), a wandering man from the fallen civilization of Khaenri'ah, cursed with immortality for failing to protect the citizens of Khaenri'ah. He leads the Traveler to temporarily reunite with their sibling.
 Rhinedottir (Voice actor:  Tanaka Atsuko,  Ivy Dupler,  Fan Churong,  Jeon So-yeon), an alchemist from Khaenri'ah and creator of Albedo, the dragon Durin, and riftwolves that plague Teyvat.
 Alice (Voice actor:  Kikuko Inoue,  Rachel Kimsey,  Qi Zhang,  Yeo Min-jeong), mother of Klee, an extraordinarily powerful traveler.

 Reception 

The characters of Genshin Impact enjoyed positive reception, specifically in terms of revenue (as Genshin Impact is a gacha game, much of its revenue comes from sales of in-game currency that players use to pull for characters). Character's revenues come from limited-time events, colloquially known as 'wishes', where players have a boosted chance to win a character. The mobile version grossed a further  between January and March 2022, adding up to more than  grossed .

Some characters enjoyed massive popularity, such as the Raiden Shogun, whose first banner earned the highest 2-day revenue at the time in the game, at $9M. Although it is impossible to calculate the full revenue across all platforms where Genshin Impact is available, certain numbers are available. As of March 2021, the character Zhongli was the highest grossing character, with $15.5M reported in revenue at the time.

 Controversy 
In November 2020, the game was met with controversy during a character's release, Zhongli, due to his equipment and gameplay being viewed as poor to the point where it was taken as an insult toward Chinese players. miHoYo published a blog post in response noting that the character was working as designed. Later, miHoYo issued an apology, and promised to improve the character's kit, during beta testing for version 1.3. 

In April 2021, some called for a boycott of the game over claims of bigotry in the game's content. Some other users pointed out how the only playable characters with dark skin were described as "exotic" or "scary" in the game. Criticism was also aimed at one of the game's adult characters expressing love towards another character that appears to be a child, though this may have been an oversight as the character in question was noted to have used an adult model during earlier stages of development.

In June 2022, following leaks of early character designs from the area of Sumeru, Genshin Impact was accused of colourism by many of its fans. Sumeru takes inspiration from many North African, West Asian, and South Asian cultures, with a great variety of skin tones ranging from pale to very dark being found among the people of these cultures. However, the characters of Sumeru were designed with predominantly pale or light brown skin. Since Genshin Impact playable characters are designed for attractiveness and marketability, this could lead to the assumption that the developers of Genshin Impact'' consider darker skin "uglier" and "not marketable enough".

References 

Genshin Impact
Lists of video game characters